Kangasmäki is a Finnish surname. Notable people with the surname include:

Aki Kangasmäki (born 1989), Finnish ice hockey player
Reino Kangasmäki (1916–2010), Finnish wrestler

Finnish-language surnames